Sicklebill can refer to:

Drepanornis, a genus of birds of paradise.
Epimachus, a genus of birds of paradise.
Eutoxeres, a genus of hummingbirds.

Animal common name disambiguation pages